Nizhnyaya Tatya (Tübän Taqıya) is a rural locality (a selo) in Shushnursky Selsoviet, Krasnokamsky District, Bashkortostan, Russia. The population was 235 as of 2010. There are 5 streets.

Geography 
Nizhnyaya Tatya is located 42 km southeast of Nikolo-Beryozovka (the district's administrative centre) by road. Grafskoye is the nearest rural locality.

References 

Rural localities in Krasnokamsky District